The Silla restoration movement refers to a series of uprisings in Yeongnam province of Korea in the middle Goryeo dynasty.  These were part of a pattern of revolts aimed at restoring one of the old Three Kingdoms of Korea which took place across Korea in the 12th century.  Representative Silla restoration revolts include those led by Yi Ui-min in 1186 and by Kim Sa-mi in 1193.

See also
History of Korea
Military history of Korea
Later Three Kingdoms of Korea

12th-century rebellions
Goryeo
Rebellions in Asia
Silla
12th century in Asia
12th century in Korea